Iowa Highway 127 (Iowa 127) is an east–west highway in Harrison County. It begins at Interstate 29 near Mondamin and ends in Logan at U.S. Highway 30 (US 30).

Route description

Iowa Highway 127 begins at an interchange with Interstate 29 (I-29) west of Mondamin, traveling east along a two-lane highway. Just east of I-29, it meets Harrison County Road K45 (CR K45), which is a former alignment of US 75.   east of Mondamin, it meets the southern end of Iowa Highway 183, which is part of the Loess Hills Scenic Byway (LHSB). The LHSB follows Iowa 127 for  before Iowa 127 turns to the east and the LHSB continues south along CR L20. The designation ends at US 30 in downtown Logan.

History
Iowa Highway 127 originally went traveled between US 75 west of Magnolia, where it now meets Harrison CR L20, and US 30 in Logan. This intersection is now where it meets CR L20. In 1968, upon completion of I-29 west of Mondamin, US 75 was relocated onto I-29 and Iowa 127 was extended west to the interstate.

Major intersections

References

127